Felice Puttini (born 18 September 1967) is a Swiss former cyclist. He was the Swiss National Road Race champion in 1994 and 1995. He also competed in the road race at the 1988 Summer Olympics.

Career achievements

Major results

1985
 2nd National Junior Road Race Championships
1987
 4th Overall GP Tell
1988
 2nd Stausee Rundfahrt Klingnau
1991
 5th Coppa Placci
1992
 5th G.P. Camaiore
1993
 3rd Overall Hofbrau Cup
 6th Overall Tour de Suisse
1994
 1st  National Road Race Championships
 1st Stage 6 Volta a Portugal
 6th Züri-Metzgete
 10th Overall Tour de Suisse
1995
 1st  National Road Race Championships
 2nd Trofeo Melinda
 3rd Grand Prix Pino Cerami
 4th Tour de Berne
 6th Giro dell'Emilia
 6th Giro di Romagna
 8th Coppa Bernocchi
 8th Subida a Urkiola
 10th Road race, UCI World Road Championships
 10th Giro di Lombardia
1996
 2nd Tour de Berne
 3rd Giro del Mendrisiotto
 3rd Grand Prix Pino Cerami
1997
 3rd Giro dell'Emilia
 4th Giro di Toscana
 7th GP Industria & Artigianato di Larciano
 8th Gran Premio Bruno Beghelli
1998
 1st Giro del Mendrisiotto
 1st Gran Premio Industria e Commercio di Prato
 3rd Giro di Lombardia
 8th Milano–Torino
1999
 3rd Overall Volta ao Distrito de Santarém
 6th Giro del Veneto
 10th Coppa Placci
2000
 1st Giro del Mendrisiotto
 9th Giro del Veneto
 4th Route Adélie
2001
 6th Tour du Lac Léman
 8th Tour de Berne
 10th Coppa Agostoni

Grand Tour general classification results timeline

References

External links

1967 births
Living people
Swiss male cyclists
Olympic cyclists of Switzerland
Cyclists at the 1988 Summer Olympics